During the 2000–01 English football season, Blackburn Rovers F.C. competed in the Football League First Division (known as the Nationwide Division One for sponsorship reasons).

Season summary
Rovers returned to the top flight of English football, thanks to a second-place finish in Division One which came two seasons after relegation. Rovers looked intent on returning to the top flight in style fulfilling the wishes of late owner Jack Walker who died shortly after the season began. Striker Matt Jansen, signed during the relegation campaign, was the club's top scorer with 23 Division One goals. Rovers also re-signed Henning Berg just after the start of the season, three years after they sold him to Manchester United. Berg was one of the club's last remaining links with the 1995 title winning side.

Final league table

Results
Blackburn Rovers' score comes first

Legend

Football League First Division

FA Cup

League Cup

First-team squad
Squad at end of season

Left club during season

Reserve squad

Top scorers

First Division
  Matt Jansen 23
  David Dunn 12
  Marcus Bent 8
  Nathan Blake 6
  Mark Hughes 5

References

Blackburn Rovers F.C. seasons
Blackburn